The Trophée Coconut Skol was a women's professional golf tournament on the Ladies European Tour that took place in France. It was held in 1990 at Fourqueux and in 1991 at Saint-Germain-en-Laye, both near Paris.

Winners

Source:

References

External links
Ladies European Tour

Former Ladies European Tour events
Defunct golf tournaments in France
Recurring sporting events established in 1990
Recurring sporting events disestablished in 1991